Milovan Ćirić (Serbian Cyrillic: Милован Ћирић; 12 February 1918 – 14 October 1986) was a Serbian football coach and former player. He was the last player to captain SK Jugoslavija and the first captain of Red Star Belgrade (1945–47) and the one-off Serbia national team of 1945. In June 1947 Ćirić moved to city rivals FK Partizan (1947–48). After finished his career as a player, Ćirić embarked on a coaching career, firstly as the youth team manager for Partizan (1948–51).

Managerial career
Throughout his long career he's coached OFK Beograd (1951–53), FK Partizan (1953/54), Yugoslavia national football team (from May to October 1954 as part of a 5-man commission along with Branko Pešić, Aleksandar Tirnanić, Leo Lemešić, and Franjo Wölfl as well as from December 1973 to July 1974 as part of another 5-man commission featuring Miljan Miljanić, Milan Ribar, Sulejman Rebac, and Tomislav Ivić), Red Star Belgrade (1954–57, 1975/76), S.S. Lazio (1957/58), Hajduk Split (1958–61, 1963/64), OFK Beograd (1961–63, 1964/65), Israel national football team (1965–68), Beşiktaş J.K. (1968/69), Aris FC (1969–71), Valencia CF (1974/75), India national football team (1984–85), etc.

References

External links
 Milovan Ćirić coach profile at mackolik.com 
 
 

1918 births
1986 deaths
Red Star Belgrade footballers
FK Partizan players
Yugoslav football managers
Serbian football managers
Serbian expatriate sportspeople in Greece
Serbian expatriate sportspeople in Italy
Serbian expatriate sportspeople in Spain
Serbian expatriate sportspeople in Turkey
OFK Beograd managers
FK Partizan managers
Red Star Belgrade managers
Beşiktaş J.K. managers
Serie A managers
Israel national football team managers
India national football team managers
La Liga managers
Aris Thessaloniki F.C. managers
Valencia CF managers
HNK Hajduk Split managers
Footballers from Belgrade
Serbian expatriate football managers
Expatriate football managers in Greece
Expatriate football managers in Italy
Expatriate football managers in Spain
Expatriate football managers in Turkey
1984 AFC Asian Cup managers
1968 AFC Asian Cup managers
Association football midfielders
Yugoslav footballers